An ultrafast monochromator is a monochromator that preserves the duration of an ultrashort pulse (in the femtosecond, or lower, time-scale).  Monochromators are devices that select for a particular wavelength, typically using a diffraction grating to disperse the light and a slit to select the desired wavelength; however, a diffraction grating introduces path delays that measurably lengthen the duration of an ultrashort pulse.   An ultrafast monochromator uses a second diffraction grating to compensate time delays introduced to the pulse by the first grating and other dispersive optical elements.

Diffraction grating
Diffraction gratings are constructed such that the angle of the incident ray, θi, is related to the angle of the mth outgoing ray, θm, by the expression

. 

Two rays diffracted by adjacent grooves will differ in path length by a distance mλ. The total difference between the longest and shortest path within a beam is computed by multiplying  mλ by the total number of grooves illuminated. 

For instance, a beam of width 10 mm illuminating a grating with 1200 grooves/mm uses 12,000 grooves. At a wavelength of 10 nm, the first order diffracted beam, m = 1, will have a path length variation across the beam of 120 μm. This corresponds to a time difference in the arrival of 400 femtoseconds. This is often negligible for picosecond pulses but not for those of femtosecond duration.

Applications
A major application is the extraction, without time-broadening, of a single high-order harmonic pulse out of the many generated by an ultrafast laser pulse interacting with a gas target.

See also
Ultrashort pulse
DESY

References

Optical devices